Lam Kee Ferry was a ferry services provider in Hong Kong. It served the Sai Wan Ho to Tung Lung Island route.

Route
Lam Kee Ferry operated one route:
 Sai Wan Ho ↔ Tung Lung Island (Closed on 21 January 2014)
This route is restored by a new operator from 20 Jun 2015, providing services only on weekend and public holidays.

Fleet
Wing Yip 3 was the company's kaito for the above route. It is a wooden kaito and has a capacity of 122 passengers.

AM50017S is the old ferry used for the route. It was originally a fishing boat with no seats. Passengers had to sit on the floor. It is not currently in use.

References

Ferry transport in Hong Kong
Transport operators of Hong Kong
Defunct companies of Hong Kong
Shipping companies of Hong Kong